The Guinea National Under-17 Football Team, represents Guinea in international football at an under-17 level and is controlled by the Fédération Guinéenne de Football. The team's first appearance on the world stage was in 1985 at the 1985 FIFA U-16 World Championship. They were originally to play in the 2019 FIFA U-17 World Cup in Brazil, but they were disqualified due to fielding two overage players. Guinea was replaced by Senegal.

Honours
 Africa U-17 Cup of Nations
 Third (3): 1995, 2015 and 2017
 FIFA U-17 World Cup:
 Fourth (1): 1985

Competitive record

FIFA U-17 World Cup Record

Africa U-17 Cup of Nations record

CAF U-16 and U-17 World Cup Qualifiers record 

 Red border color indicates tournament was held on home soil.
*Draws include knockout matches decided on penalty kicks.

Current squad
The following players were selected to compete in the 2017 FIFA U-17 World Cup.

Head Coach:  Souleymane Camara

See also
Guinea national football team
Guinea national under-23 football team
Guinea national under-20 football team

References

External links
Team profile - soccerway.com

African national under-17 association football teams
Under-17